Page Lake may refer to:

Page Lake (Minnesota)
Page Lake (Pennsylvania)